15 Años (Spanish "quince años") or 15 Anos (Portuguese: "quinze anos") may refer to:

 Quinceañera, a Latino-American celebration of the coming of age of a 15-year-old girl
 15 Años (Menudo album)
 15 Anos (Pólo Norte album)